The 2001 Giro d'Italia was the 84th edition of the Giro d'Italia, one of cycling's Grand Tours. The Giro began in Montesilvano, with a Prologue individual time trial on 19 May, and Stage 10 occurred on 29 May with a stage to Ljubljana, Slovenia. The race finished in Milan on 10 June.

Prologue
19 May 2001 — Montesilvano to Pescara,  (ITT)

Stage 1
20 May 2001 — Giulianova to Francavilla al Mare,

Stage 2
21 May 2001 — Fossacesia to Lucera,

Stage 3
22 May 2001 — Lucera to Potenza,

Stage 4
23 May 2001 — Potenza to Mercogliano,

Stage 5
24 May 2001 — Avellino to Nettuno,

Stage 6
25 May 2001 — Nettuno to Rieti,

Stage 7
26 May 2001 — Rieti to Montevarchi,

Stage 8
27 May 2001 — Montecatini Terme to Reggio Emilia,

Stage 9
28 May 2001 — Reggio Emilia to Rovigo,

Stage 10
29 May 2001 — Lido di Jesolo to Ljubljana,

References

2001 Giro d'Italia
Giro d'Italia stages